Walter David Schnaubelt (born 4 October 1966) of New Ireland, Chinese and Austrian parentage is the Member of Parliament for the Namatanai Open Electorate in the New Ireland Province of Papua New Guinea. He is a member and current National President of the National Alliance Party. He defeated his first cousin Byron Chan by a landslide victory collecting 20,479 votes to Byron's 12,804 to claim the Namatanai Open Seat. He won gold in Karate at the Pacific Games in 1999 in Guam. Join the coalition government led by James Marape and Steven Davis in August 2019.

References

 
Kyokushin kaikan practitioners
People from New Ireland Province
People from Namatanai
People from Matalai
Papua New Guinean male martial artists
Members of the National Parliament of Papua New Guinea
National Alliance Party (Papua New Guinea) politicians
Papua New Guinean people of Austrian descent
Papua New Guinean people of Chinese descent
Papua New Guinean politicians of Chinese descent
1966 births
Living people